Ivan Ćurković (born 15 March 1944) is a Serbian sports executive and former footballer who played as a goalkeeper.

During his playing career that spanned 21 seasons from 1960 to 1981, Ćurković made over 700 official appearances for three clubs in Yugoslavia and France, winning numerous trophies and reaching the European Cup final on two occasions, with Partizan in 1966 and Saint-Étienne in 1976. He was also capped 19 times by Yugoslavia at senior level between 1963 and 1970.

After hanging up his boots, Ćurković held various high-level administrative positions, including serving as president of the Serbian Olympic Committee and vice-president of the Serbian Football Association. He also acted as president of his former club Partizan for almost two decades from 1989 to 2006.

Club career
A talented goalie, Ćurković began at his hometown club Velež Mostar and was officially registered by the club in 1958. He would sign his first professional contract in 1960 at the age of 16. During the 1960–61 Yugoslav First League, his first senior season, Ćurković played 13 (out of 22) games and helped the team narrowly avoid relegation from the top flight. He spent three more seasons with the Rođeni, leading them to a fourth-place finish in 1962–63.

In 1964, Ćurković was transferred to Partizan. He would become the first-choice goalkeeper in his debut season after Milutin Šoškić joined the army to complete his compulsory military service, helping the club win the championship. During the next season in 1965–66, Ćurković served as a backup to Šoškić through their European Cup campaign that year, as Partizan lost in the final to Real Madrid. He spent a total of eight seasons with the Crno-beli, making 227 appearances across all competitions.

In 1972, Ćurković moved abroad to France and signed with Saint-Étienne. He immediately established himself as the starting goalkeeper and played nine seasons with Les Verts, winning four domestic championship titles (1973–74, 1974–75, 1975–76, and 1980–81), three national cups (1973–74, 1974–75, and 1976–77), and reaching the European Cup final in 1975–76.

International career
At international level, Ćurković played 19 matches for Yugoslavia between 1963 and 1970. He participated at the 1964 Summer Olympics in Tokyo.

Post-playing career
Between 1989 and 2006, Ćurković served as president of his former club Partizan, establishing a long-lasting partnership with general secretary Žarko Zečević and sporting director Nenad Bjeković.

In May 2001, Ćurković was appointed by the Football Association of FR Yugoslavia as co-manager of the FR Yugoslavia national team alongside Vujadin Boškov and Dejan Savićević, replacing Milovan Đorić after poor results at the start of the 2002 FIFA World Cup qualification.

In July 2005, Ćurković was appointed as acting president of the Olympic Committee of Serbia and Montenegro, replacing Philip Zepter. He officially became president on 8 March 2006. Following the split between the two nations, Ćurković served as president of the Olympic Committee of Serbia until February 2009.

On 23 December 2009, Ćurković was named vice-president of the Football Association of Serbia during the presidential term of Tomislav Karadžić.

Personal life
Born in Mostar, DF Yugoslavia (in present-day Bosnia and Herzegovina), Ćurković declares himself as a Croat and a Catholic.

In 1982, Ćurković was granted French citizenship by a decree of President François Mitterrand. On 5 October 2005, Curkovic was awarded a knighthood in France's "Legion of Honour", in which French soccer icon Michel Platini presented the award in a Belgrade ceremony.

Career statistics

Club

International

Honours

Partizan
 Yugoslav First League: 1964–65
 European Cup: Runner-up 1965–66
Saint-Étienne
 French Division 1: 1973–74, 1974–75, 1975–76, 1980–81
 Coupe de France: 1973–74, 1974–75, 1976–77
 European Cup: Runner-up 1975–76

References

External links

 
 
 

AS Saint-Étienne players
Association football goalkeepers
Competitors at the 1971 Mediterranean Games
Croats of Bosnia and Herzegovina
Expatriate footballers in France
FK Partizan players
FK Partizan presidents
FK Velež Mostar players
Footballers at the 1964 Summer Olympics
Ligue 1 players
Mediterranean Games gold medalists for Yugoslavia
Mediterranean Games medalists in football
Olympic footballers of Yugoslavia
Recipients of the Legion of Honour
Serbia and Montenegro football managers
Serbia and Montenegro national football team managers
Serbian sports executives and administrators
Sportspeople from Mostar
Yugoslav expatriate footballers
Yugoslav expatriate sportspeople in France
Yugoslav First League players
Yugoslav footballers
Yugoslavia international footballers
1944 births
Living people